Eucalyptus normantonensis, commonly known as Normanton box, is a species of mallee, rarely a small tree, that is endemic to northern Australia. It has rough, fibrous or flaky bark on some or all of the stems, lance-shaped to curved adult leaves, flower buds in groups of between seven and eleven, white flowers and cylindrical, barrel-shaped or shortened spherical fruit.

Description
It has rough, fibrous or flaky bark on some or all of the stems and smooth brownish bark above. Flowering occurs in most months and the flowers are white.

Taxonomy and naming
Eucalyptus normantonensis was first formally described in 1919 by Joseph Maiden and Richard Cambage in Journal and Proceedings of the Royal Society of New South Wales from specimens collected by Cambage near Normanton. The specific epithet (normantonensis) refers to the town in Queensland, where the type specimen was collected.

Distribution and habitat
Normanton box is found in widely dispersed populations in Western Australia, the Northern Territory and Queensland between the hot, arid north-eastern part of the Gibson Desert and the hot, monsoonal south-eastern hinterland of the Gulf of Carpentaria. It grows in low, open woodland on flats, undulating areas and drainage lines.

Conservation status
This eucalypt is classified as "not threatened" by the Western Australian Government Department of Environment and Conservation (Western Australia) and as "least concern" under the Northern Territory Government Territory Parks and Wildlife Conservation Act 1976 and the Queensland Government Nature Conservation Act 1992.

See also
List of Eucalyptus species

References

normantonensis
Flora of the Northern Territory
Flora of Queensland
Mallees (habit)
Myrtales of Australia
Eucalypts of Western Australia
Plants described in 1919
Taxa named by Joseph Maiden